In Greek mythology, Tisander (Ancient Greek: Τίσανδρος) or Tisandrus (Ancient Greek: Τίσανδρον) was a son of Jason and the Colchian sorceress Medea, the daughter of King Aeëtes, and the younger brother of Alcimenes and Thessalus.

Mythology 
Tisander and Alcimenes were murdered by Medea in her revenge plot against Jason, after he had abandoned her and gone to marry Glauce, the daughter of King Creon of Corinth.

Sources differ over the number and names of Medea's children, varying from one child to fourteen:

Notes

References 

 Diodorus Siculus, The Library of History translated by Charles Henry Oldfather. Twelve volumes. Loeb Classical Library. Cambridge, Massachusetts: Harvard University Press; London: William Heinemann, Ltd. 1989. Vol. 3. Books 4.59–8. Online version at Bill Thayer's Web Site
 Diodorus Siculus, Bibliotheca Historica. Vol 1-2. Immanel Bekker. Ludwig Dindorf. Friedrich Vogel. in aedibus B. G. Teubneri. Leipzig. 1888–1890. Greek text available at the Perseus Digital Library.
Children of Medea
Children of Jason